Paul Alexandre René Janet (30 April 1823 – 4 October 1899) was a French philosopher and writer.

Biography
Born in Paris, he became professor of moral philosophy at Bourges (1845–1848) and Strasbourg (1848–1857), and of logic at the lycée Louis-le-Grand, Paris (1857–1864). In 1864 he was appointed to the chair of philosophy at the Sorbonne, and elected a member of the academy of moral and political sciences.

He wrote widely on philosophy, politics and ethics, on idealistic lines: La Famille, Histoire de la philosophie dans l'antiquité et dans le temps moderne, Histoire de la science politique, Philosophie de la Revolution Française, etc. However, in the opinion of 1911 Encyclopædia Britannica, these writings are not characterised by much originality of thought. In philosophy he was a follower of Victor Cousin, and through him of G. W. F. Hegel. His principal work, Théorie de la morale, owes much to Immanuel Kant.

Works 
The Materialism of the Present Day, a Critique of Dr. Büchner's System

Notes

References

External links
 
 

1823 births
1899 deaths
Academic staff of the University of Bourges
Academic staff of the University of Strasbourg
Academic staff of the University of Paris
French philosophers
French essayists
École Normale Supérieure alumni
French male essayists